Rinaghju (Renaju) is an archaeological site in Corsica.  It is located in the commune of Sartène.

In a distance of 300 m are Stantari alignments and the dolmen of Funtanaccia.

Archaeological sites in Corsica